Beechland, in Jeffersontown, Kentucky, was built in 1812.  It was listed on the National Register of Historic Places in 1983.  The listing included three contributing buildings.

It is a two-story, three bay, brick side hall plan house with a Flemish bond front facade, with a two-story original ell and a later one-story ell.

The property included a brick smokehouse and a one-story, brick slave quarters, plus later non-contributing farm buildings.

It previously was located at 8500 Six Mile Lane before suburb construction.

References

National Register of Historic Places in Jefferson County, Kentucky
Houses completed in 1812
Slave cabins and quarters in the United States
1812 establishments in Kentucky
Houses on the National Register of Historic Places in Kentucky
Relocated buildings and structures in Kentucky
Jeffersontown, Kentucky